Bettini v Gye (1876) 1 QBD 183 is an English contract law case, concerning the right to terminate performance of a contract.

Facts
The tenor :it:Alessandro Bettini agreed with opera manager Frederick Gye that he would not sing anywhere within fifty miles of London except at the Royal Italian Opera, Covent Garden (now the Royal Opera House), from 1 January to 1 December, and would perform for him from 30 March to 13 July 1875 for £150 per month. Bettini was supposed to perform concerts or operas. Importantly, Bettini was meant to be in London ‘without fail’ 6 days before rehearsals, but did not arrive until 28 March, at which point he was ready to perform. However, Gye rejected Bettini’s performance.

Judgment
Blackburn J held the provision for arriving 6 days before was not a condition, and therefore breach of it did not give rise to the right to terminate. If clear words had stipulated that in the event Mr Bettini did not show up Gye could terminate, or that Bettini would forfeit twice his salary, that would provide the answer. Here Bettini had already performed his covenant to not sing in the UK in the months running up to 30 March, and not showing for rehearsals could only affect theatrical performances and singing in duets during the first week or fortnight. So the breach did not go to the root of the contract, and Gye was not entitled to terminate.

See also

English contract law

Notes

References

English contract case law
1876 in case law
1876 in British law